A Park Lane Scandal is a 1915 British silent drama film directed by Warwick Buckland and starring Flora Morris, Joseph R. Tozer and Harry Gilbey.

Cast
 Flora Morris as The Woman 
 Joseph R. Tozer as The Man 
 Austin Camp   
 Harry Gilbey  
 Sybil Wollaston  
 J.H. Lewis

References

Bibliography
 Palmer, Scott. British Film Actors' Credits, 1895-1987. McFarland, 1988.

External links

1915 films
Films set in London
1915 drama films
British drama films
British silent short films
Films directed by Warwick Buckland
British black-and-white films
1910s English-language films
1910s British films
Silent drama films